Barry Rigal (born 1958) is a bridge player, author, commentator and journalist. Born in England, he was married to world champion Sue Picus and lives in New York.

Rigal has represented England in the Camrose Trophy Home International series five times and won the Gold Cup; he was a multiple winner of the Spring Fours and Tollemache Trophy.

Rigal has been a Vugraph commentator for thirty years and chief commentator for the European Bridge League (EBL) and World Bridge Federation (WBF) since 2006. He has been an executive member of the International Bridge Press Association (IBPA) since the early 1990s and was appointed President in September 2016.

Publications 
Rigal edited Bridge for Dummies, was co-editor of the seventh edition and a contributing editor of the sixth edition of The Official Encyclopedia of Bridge and author of Card Games for Dummies.

Rigal has written for the World Championship Book for two decades. Rigal's books include a series called Breaking the Rules and books on declarer and defender deception. He is a regular contributor to Bridge World in the US and Bridge Magazine in the UK. He is also a columnist for the American Contract Bridge League (ACBL) and regularly contributes to the Daily Bulletins at national championships. Particulars follow:

Bridge accomplishments

Wins 

 Gold Cup (1) 1991 
 North American Bridge Championships (2)
 Keohane North American Swiss Teams (1) 2005 
 Chicago Mixed Board-a-Match (1) 2000

Runners-up 

 Gold Cup (1) 1987 
 North American Bridge Championships (1)
 Keohane North American Swiss Teams (1) 1994

Notes

External links 
 

1958 births
Living people
British and Irish contract bridge players
English writers